The Astrakhan constituency (No.74) is a Russian legislative constituency, covering the entirety of Astrakhan Oblast.

Members elected

Election results

1993

|-
! colspan=2 style="background-color:#E9E9E9;text-align:left;vertical-align:top;" |Candidate
! style="background-color:#E9E9E9;text-align:left;vertical-align:top;" |Party
! style="background-color:#E9E9E9;text-align:right;" |Votes
! style="background-color:#E9E9E9;text-align:right;" |%
|-
|style="background-color:"|
|align=left|Vladislav Vinogradov
|align=left|Independent
|
|17.56%
|-
|style="background-color:#019CDC"|
|align=left|Aleksandr Saushin
|align=left|Party of Russian Unity and Accord
| -
|15.80%
|-
| colspan="5" style="background-color:#E9E9E9;"|
|- style="font-weight:bold"
| colspan="3" style="text-align:left;" | Total
| 
| 100%
|-
| colspan="5" style="background-color:#E9E9E9;"|
|- style="font-weight:bold"
| colspan="4" |Source:
|
|}

1995

|-
! colspan=2 style="background-color:#E9E9E9;text-align:left;vertical-align:top;" |Candidate
! style="background-color:#E9E9E9;text-align:left;vertical-align:top;" |Party
! style="background-color:#E9E9E9;text-align:right;" |Votes
! style="background-color:#E9E9E9;text-align:right;" |%
|-
|style="background-color:"|
|align=left|Vyacheslav Zvolinsky
|align=left|Independent
|
|23.46%
|-
|style="background-color:"|
|align=left|Vladislav Vinogradov (incumbent)
|align=left|Independent
|
|16.25%
|-
|style="background-color:"|
|align=left|Dmitry Babaytsev
|align=left|Liberal Democratic Party
|
|9.18%
|-
|style="background-color:"|
|align=left|Yury Kagakov
|align=left|Our Home – Russia
|
|8.95%
|-
|style="background-color:"|
|align=left|Anver Almayev
|align=left|Independent
|
|7.96%
|-
|style="background-color:#E98282"|
|align=left|Galina Chubkova
|align=left|Women of Russia
|
|4.86%
|-
|style="background-color:#D50000"|
|align=left|Oleg Shein
|align=left|Communists and Working Russia - for the Soviet Union
|
|4.52%
|-
|style="background-color:#3A46CE"|
|align=left|Natalia Osukhova
|align=left|Democratic Choice of Russia – United Democrats
|
|3.84%
|-
|style="background-color:"|
|align=left|Vyacheslav Tonkikh
|align=left|Independent
|
|3.41%
|-
|style="background-color:"|
|align=left|Andrey Melnikov
|align=left|Independent
|
|2.21%
|-
|style="background-color:#DA2021"|
|align=left|Valery Alekseyev
|align=left|Ivan Rybkin Bloc
|
|1.90%
|-
|style="background-color:"|
|align=left|Dzhanbek Sultanov
|align=left|Independent
|
|1.82%
|-
|style="background-color:"|
|align=left|Vladimir Koznov
|align=left|Serving Russia
|
|1.02%
|-
|style="background-color:"|
|align=left|Sergey Chaplygin
|align=left|Independent
|
|0.75%
|-
|style="background-color:"|
|align=left|Nina Poverina
|align=left|Independent
|
|0.65%
|-
|style="background-color:"|
|align=left|Gennady Shchetinin
|align=left|Independent
|
|0.42%
|-
|style="background-color:"|
|align=left|Viktor Repin
|align=left|Independent
|
|0.31%
|-
|style="background-color:#000000"|
|colspan=2 |against all
|
|6.08%
|-
| colspan="5" style="background-color:#E9E9E9;"|
|- style="font-weight:bold"
| colspan="3" style="text-align:left;" | Total
| 
| 100%
|-
| colspan="5" style="background-color:#E9E9E9;"|
|- style="font-weight:bold"
| colspan="4" |Source:
|
|}

1999

|-
! colspan=2 style="background-color:#E9E9E9;text-align:left;vertical-align:top;" |Candidate
! style="background-color:#E9E9E9;text-align:left;vertical-align:top;" |Party
! style="background-color:#E9E9E9;text-align:right;" |Votes
! style="background-color:#E9E9E9;text-align:right;" |%
|-
|style="background-color:"|
|align=left|Oleg Shein
|align=left|Independent
|
|21.47%
|-
|style="background-color:"|
|align=left|Nikolay Arefyev
|align=left|Communist Party
|
|19.07%
|-
|style="background-color:"|
|align=left|Anver Almayev
|align=left|Independent
|
|16.39%
|-
|style="background-color:"|
|align=left|Sergey Bozhenov
|align=left|Yabloko
|
|14.15%
|-
|style="background-color:"|
|align=left|Svetlana Kudryavtseva
|align=left|Independent
|
|12.85%
|-
|style="background-color:"|
|align=left|Oleg Sarychev
|align=left|Independent
|
|2.86%
|-
|style="background-color:#020266"|
|align=left|Igor Negerev
|align=left|Russian Socialist Party
|
|2.19%
|-
|style="background-color:"|
|align=left|Boris Karpachev
|align=left|Independent
|
|0.82%
|-
|style="background-color:"|
|align=left|Aleksandr Mikhaylov
|align=left|Independent
|
|0.69%
|-
|style="background-color:#00542A"|
|align=left|Sergey Chunosov
|align=left|Russian Party
|
|0.33%
|-
|style="background-color:#000000"|
|colspan=2 |against all
|
|7.17%
|-
| colspan="5" style="background-color:#E9E9E9;"|
|- style="font-weight:bold"
| colspan="3" style="text-align:left;" | Total
| 
| 100%
|-
| colspan="5" style="background-color:#E9E9E9;"|
|- style="font-weight:bold"
| colspan="4" |Source:
|
|}

2003

|-
! colspan=2 style="background-color:#E9E9E9;text-align:left;vertical-align:top;" |Candidate
! style="background-color:#E9E9E9;text-align:left;vertical-align:top;" |Party
! style="background-color:#E9E9E9;text-align:right;" |Votes
! style="background-color:#E9E9E9;text-align:right;" |%
|-
|style="background-color:"|
|align=left|Oleg Shein (incumbent)
|align=left|Independent
|
|35.85%
|-
|style="background-color:"|
|align=left|Sergey Bozhenov
|align=left|Independent
|
|22.68%
|-
|style="background-color:"|
|align=left|Nikolay Arefyev
|align=left|Communist Party
|
|9.97%
|-
|style="background-color:"|
|align=left|Leonid Ogul
|align=left|United Russia
|
|9.65%
|-
|style="background-color:#7C73CC"|
|align=left|Anver Almayev
|align=left|Great Russia–Eurasian Union
|
|4.16%
|-
|style="background-color:"|
|align=left|Eduard Nedelko
|align=left|Independent
|
|3.48%
|-
|style="background-color:"|
|align=left|Dmitry Ugryumov
|align=left|Liberal Democratic Party
|
|2.30%
|-
|style="background-color:"|
|align=left|Viktor Shlyakhov
|align=left|Agrarian Party
|
|1.77%
|-
|style="background-color:#FFD700"|
|align=left|Nuriya Kurmaliyeva
|align=left|People's Party
|
|0.82%
|-
|style="background-color:#DBB726"|
|align=left|Boris Karpachev
|align=left|Democratic Party
|
|0.58%
|-
|style="background-color:"|
|align=left|Boris Shuvarin
|align=left|Social Democratic Party
|
|0.44%
|-
|style="background-color:#000000"|
|colspan=2 |against all
|
|6.62%
|-
| colspan="5" style="background-color:#E9E9E9;"|
|- style="font-weight:bold"
| colspan="3" style="text-align:left;" | Total
| 
| 100%
|-
| colspan="5" style="background-color:#E9E9E9;"|
|- style="font-weight:bold"
| colspan="4" |Source:
|
|}

2016

|-
! colspan=2 style="background-color:#E9E9E9;text-align:left;vertical-align:top;" |Candidate
! style="background-color:#E9E9E9;text-align:leftt;vertical-align:top;" |Party
! style="background-color:#E9E9E9;text-align:right;" |Votes
! style="background-color:#E9E9E9;text-align:right;" |%
|-
|style="background-color:"|
|align=left|Leonid Ogul
|align=left|United Russia
|
|38.74%
|-
|style="background:"| 
|align=left|Oleg Shein
|align=left|A Just Russia
|
|32.95%
|-
|style="background-color:"|
|align=left|Nikolay Arefyev
|align=left|Communist Party
|
|11.31%
|-
|style="background-color:"|
|align=left|Yegor Vostrikov
|align=left|Liberal Democratic Party
|
|6.55%
|-
|style="background-color: " |
|align=left|Yegor Kovalev
|align=left|Communists of Russia
|
|2.33%
|-
|style="background-color: " |
|align=left|Nailya Nikitina
|align=left|Party of Growth
|
|1.75%
|-
|style="background:"| 
|align=left|Mikhail Doliyev
|align=left|People's Freedom Party
|
|1.22%
|-
|style="background-color:"|
|align=left|Sergey Rodionov
|align=left|The Greens
|
|1.06%
|-
| colspan="5" style="background-color:#E9E9E9;"|
|- style="font-weight:bold"
| colspan="3" style="text-align:left;" | Total
| 
| 100%
|-
| colspan="5" style="background-color:#E9E9E9;"|
|- style="font-weight:bold"
| colspan="4" |Source:
|
|}

2021

|-
! colspan=2 style="background-color:#E9E9E9;text-align:left;vertical-align:top;" |Candidate
! style="background-color:#E9E9E9;text-align:left;vertical-align:top;" |Party
! style="background-color:#E9E9E9;text-align:right;" |Votes
! style="background-color:#E9E9E9;text-align:right;" |%
|-
|style="background-color:"|
|align=left|Leonid Ogul (incumbent)
|align=left|United Russia
|
|47.81%
|-
|style="background-color: " |
|align=left|Oleg Shein
|align=left|A Just Russia — For Truth
|
|19.20%
|-
|style="background-color:"|
|align=left|Khalit Aitov
|align=left|Communist Party
|
|9.93%
|-
|style="background-color:"|
|align=left|Aivar Abeldayev
|align=left|New People
|
|3.46%
|-
|style="background:"| 
|align=left|Karen Grigoryan
|align=left|Rodina
|
|2.82%
|-
|style="background-color: " |
|align=left|Roman Sultanov
|align=left|Communists of Russia
|
|2.73%
|-
|style="background-color: "|
|align=left|Larisa Samodayeva
|align=left|Party of Pensioners
|
|2.23%
|-
|style="background-color:"|
|align=left|Rustam Shuabasov
|align=left|Liberal Democratic Party
|
|2.03%
|-
|style="background-color: "|
|align=left|Darya Matveyeva
|align=left|Russian Party of Freedom and Justice
|
|1.76%
|-
|style="background:"| 
|align=left|Alyona Gubanova
|align=left|Civic Platform
|
|1.62%
|-
|style="background:"| 
|align=left|Dmitry Anufriyev
|align=left|Yabloko
|
|1.33%
|-
|style="background-color: " |
|align=left|Nailya Nikitina
|align=left|Party of Growth
|
|0.88%
|-
|style="background-color:"|
|align=left|Aleksandr Plokhov
|align=left|The Greens
|
|0.75%
|-
| colspan="5" style="background-color:#E9E9E9;"|
|- style="font-weight:bold"
| colspan="3" style="text-align:left;" | Total
| 
| 100%
|-
| colspan="5" style="background-color:#E9E9E9;"|
|- style="font-weight:bold"
| colspan="4" |Source:
|
|}

Notes

References

Russian legislative constituencies
Politics of Astrakhan Oblast